Tatarinov is a Russian surname. The feminine form is Tatarinova. Among those with this name are:

Tatarinov
Aleksandr Tatarinov (b. 1950), naval officer
Alexander Tatarinov (b. 1982), ice hockey player
Andrey Tatarinov (b. 1951), diplomat
Andrey Yuryevich Tatarinov (b. 1988), politician, social activist and journalist
Gennady Tatarinov (b. 1991), cyclist
German Tatarinov (1925-2006), painter
Kirill Tatarinov, businessman
Leonid Petrovich Tatarinov (1926-2011),  paleontologist and evolutionary biologist
Mikhail Tatarinov (b. 1966), ice hockey player
Nikolay Tatarinov (1927-2017), pentathetle, olympian
Yevgeni Tatarinov (b. 1999), footballer

Tatarinova
Anna Tatarinova (b. 1978), footballer

See also
17169 Tatarinov, a minor planet

Russian-language surnames
Ethnonymic surnames